Breakthrough is a global human rights organization working to end violence against women and girls.

Organization and mission 

Based in India and the United States, Breakthrough's multimedia campaigns address global issues including violence against women, sexuality and HIV/AIDS, and immigrant rights and racial justice. Breakthrough envisions a world in which all people enjoy their human rights and live with dignity, equality, and justice. We can build this world by making violence and discrimination against women and girls unacceptable.

Their mission is to prevent violence against women and girls by transforming the norms and cultures that enable it. They carry out this mission by building a critical mass of change agents worldwide — the Breakthrough Generation — whose bold collective action will deliver irreversible impact on the issue of our time. Working out of centers in India and the U.S., Breakthrough creates innovative, relevant multimedia tools and programs — from short animations to long-term leadership training — that reach individuals and institutions where they are, inspiring and equipping them to build a world in which all people live with dignity, equality, and justice.

History 

Indian-American human rights activist and cultural entrepreneur Mallika Dutt founded Breakthrough in 2000 with Mann ke Manjeeré: An Album of Women's Dreams, an album and music video on women’s rights. Launched as an experiment in using pop culture and media for social justice, Mann ke Manjeeré remained on the Indian pop charts for six weeks, going on to win the 2001 National Screen Award in India for best music video.

On using pop culture tools to promote human rights, Dutt has said, “After working inside the global human rights movement for most of my professional life, the experience of seeing the same faces at every meeting, policy brief or conference had left me frustrated … The more I thought about it, the more convinced I’d become that media, art and popular culture could express [human rights] values in new ways for new audiences.”

Dutt served as President and CEO through March 2017. As of July 2017, the President and CEO is Sohini Bhattacharya.

Recent campaigns and initiatives

Bell Bajao! (Ring the Bell!) 

Developed in pro bono partnership with Ogilvy & Mather, Bell Bajao is a domestic violence awareness on men and boys to act as partners in ending violence against women. Since 2008, Bell Bajao has reached more than 130 million people in India through a series of popular television advertisements.

Breakthrough’s Bell Bajao (Ring the Bell), their largest and most widely lauded campaign, has called on millions across the globe to “ring the bell” against domestic violence. This multimedia campaign—recipient of a prestigious Cannes Silver Lion—shows men ringing the doorbell to interrupt overheard violence, positioning domestic abuse as everyone’s issue and men as partners, not just perpetrators. Their community workshops and leadership trainings use games, street theater, and other relevant cultural tools to transform brothers, sisters, fathers, and mothers into advocates for women’s rights. Bell Bajao’s tools and tactics have been adapted by individuals and organizations in many nations worldwide, leading to the campaign's formal global expansion, Ring the Bell. Community by country by continent, Breakthrough is working to build a world in which everyone is safe in their homes and limitless in their dreams.

On March 8, 2013, Breakthrough launched Ring the Bell, a global extension of their Bell Bajao campaign. The global campaign was launched in partnership with prominent celebrities and leading men including Sir Patrick Stewart, singer and songwriter Michael Bolton, former NFL player and activist Don McPherson, Mayor of Dallas Mike Rawlings, comedian and political commentator Dean Obeidallah and spoken word artist Darnell L. Moore. The campaign is also supported by Sir Richard Branson, Bollywood actor Amitabh Bachchan, former Under-Secretary-General and Executive Director of UN Women Michelle Bachelet, producer and director Joe Wright, musician Anoushka Shankar, and Bollywood actor Rahul Bose.

Nation Against Early Marriage 
Early marriage is a widespread problem in India, and is linked to an array of other gender-based issues, including low female education levels, domestic violence, teen maternity, and female disempowerment. Nation Against Early Marriage aims to address these challenges through eradicating early marriage by promoting healthy gender norms, male-female relationships, and acceptance of female sexuality.

The program is being implemented on the ground in two Ranchi and Hazaribagh, Jharkhand, and Gaya, Bihar, all located in northern India. The program consists of mass media intervention, block-level training with NGOs, CBOs, self-help groups, and youth groups, and community mobilizations.

Breakthrough produced public service announcement videos about the harms of early marriage. These Hindi-language videos urge fathers to reconsider if early marriage is best for their daughter. Breakthrough also produced mini-documentaries about girls who were confronted with early marriage, which are posted on Breakthrough's website.

Gender-Biased Sex Selection 
Gender-biased sex selection (GBSS) is a result and an expression of cultural preference for sons. Son preference, in turn, is an expression of deeply rooted and long-held biases against women and girls. These biases are related to societal beliefs, norms, and practices that position girls as risks and burdens, and less worthy than sons of family investment. Bottom line, girls are not valued. These norms and practices run deep and their consequences reach far. In fact, among many communities, including those we work in:
 Girls may be given names considered ugly, such as Bhateri, Bhoti, or Varsha, all meaning "Enough!"
 When a girl dies, a red thread (dhaga) is tied to her arm with a note saying, "Next time send a boy" ("Agli baar bhaiya bhejna").
 A majority of men believe that raising a daughter is "like irrigating someone else's land."
 The shortage of young women resulting from GBSS leads communities to increased acts of violence and trafficking brides from other regions, decreasing safety and security for women.
Effective laws and enforcement are needed to combat GBSS, which is illegal [in India]. But Breakthrough believes that to reduce and prevent the practice for good, we need culture change. We need to challenge the norms and practices that devalue girls. Breakthrough works to inspire and support families and communities to stand up and say “Daughters are welcome here.”

Other campaigns and initiatives

Deport The Statue 
In 2013, Breakthrough partnered with The Yes Men to reach and energize new supporters for women’s and immigrants’ rights. The Deport the Statue campaign's goal is to deport the Statue of Liberty under the premise that she does not have legal documentation for living and working in the United States. It is run by the mock organization Legals for the Preservation of American Culture (LPAC). LPAC's website, deportthestatue.us, incorporates video, text, interactive features, social media advocacy, and downloadable materials to promote this goal. Website links direct to related media and Breakthrough's Deport the Statue campaign landing page, which explains the rationale behind the mock campaign and urges readers to join a movement for fair immigration reform by taking concrete actions, such as contacting their Congress members and joining Breakthrough on the web and on the ground.

Around its launch in June 2013, Deport the Statue received wide attention from the press, which further propelled the campaign. Unfortunately, immigration reform failed to pass in Congress. Since then, Breakthrough has continued to push the campaign online and with partner events, including participation in the Bushwick Film Festival, and October event with the Illuminator for the National Day for Immigrant Dignity and Respect.

As of November 2013, the namesake video has over 100,000 YouTube views and the Deport the Statue campaign page has over 700 views per month

#ImHere 
Breakthrough’s #ImHere multimedia campaign reached more than 7 million people and mobilized thousands of everyday Americans to say “#ImHere” to promote the rights of immigrant women. Through a potent mix of user-generated content, targeted social media, and partnerships with artists and celebrities including Conor Oberst and Margaret Cho, the campaign exposed large new audiences to the ways in which U.S. immigration policy causes and perpetuates violence against immigrant women. Its centerpiece, "The Call" — a short narrative film about one mother facing an impossible choice — brought home the impact of U.S. policy on the daily lives of immigrant women and families. By connecting emotionally and personally with a critical mass of new supporters, #ImHere helped propel the rights of immigrant women onto the national agenda at a pivotal moment in American history and drove palpable — and continued — demand for change. Immigration overhaul became a top priority for leaders and lawmakers, and newly energized supporters now demand that immigrant women and their rights remain a priority, too.

ICED - I Can End Deportation 

ICED - I Can End Deportation is a first-of-its-kind, free, downloadable 3D video game that puts players in the shoes of immigrants struggling to live, study, and work in the U.S. With hundreds of thousands of downloads and extensive press coverage worldwide, it has changed the way people think about the human rights of immigrants and the importance of due process and fairness for all.

America 2049 

America 2049 is the first transmedia Facebook game to use the platform to explore assumptions about racial justice, human rights, migration and democracy. Players assume fictional character roles to engage in a plot that highlights major human rights themes (i.e. migration, voting and constitutional rights, trafficking, LGBT rights, labor rights, racial profiling, and more). Players engage with videos, graphics, microsites and social media platforms to find clues and solve puzzles to advance in the game. American 2049 also features prominent celebrities such as Harold Perrineau, Victor Garber, Cherry Jones, Anthony Rapp, and Margaret Cho.

Restore Fairness 

Launched in 2009, the Restore Fairness campaign is a video documentary series and blog calling on the U.S. government to uphold fair immigration and racial justice. The campaign's documentary shorts feature stories about life in the United States for immigrants and communities of color after September 11, 2001. The Restore Fairness campaign uses compelling video documentaries along with a timely blog to draw attention to the ways in which immigration policy and laws in the United States affect the everyday lives of people, often denying them basic American values of fairness and due process. The documentaries, produced in partnership with civil society and human rights groups, tell the stories of men and women whose human rights have been violated - who have been humiliated as a result of their racial or ethnic background, inhumanely detained, suffered pain and abuse, and separated from their families and loved ones.

I Am This Land 

A nationwide three-month video contest launched in 2010, I Am This Land called on young Americans to use their vivid imaginative capacity to illuminate and celebrate the power of diversity, pluralism, identity, gender and sexuality, immigration, and racial justice. The contest was publicized with a coordinated, partner-drive campaign of animated mini-videos, celebrity PSAs, and social media, ultimately bringing the message of the contest to tens of thousands of people. Visitors to iamthisland.org voted to select the top ten videos; in early 2011, a distinguished panel of judges representing the music industry, youth, and feminist advocacy chose the video they believed most enthusiastically and effectively brought to life the value of diversity.

What Kind of Man Are You? 

Developed in pro bono partnership with McCann Erickson, What Kind of Man Are You? is a multimedia campaign asking men to wear condoms to prevent the transmission of HIV/AIDS to their wives. The campaign encouraged an open, national dialogue about a woman's right to negotiate safe sex within marriage.

Is This Justice? 

Developed in pro bono partnership with advertising agency Ogilvy & Mather, Is This Justice? was a multimedia awareness campaign launched in 2007 about the stigma and discrimination faced by women, particularly widows, living with HIV/AIDS. Many women living with HIV/AIDS have been infected by their husbands or male partners, and suffer discrimination because of the disease. In India, 92% of women widowed by AIDS are forced by family members to leave home after their husband's death. This campaign sought to put a face to the issue through public service announcements, and by inviting HIV-positive women to share their stories. Ogilvy & Mather produced this campaign pro bono in four languages: Hindi, English, Kannada and Marathi. The "Is This Justice" PSAs received the 2007 Radio and TV Advertising Practitioner's Association of India award for "Best Film with a Social Message" and the 2008 Bronze Abby Award in the Public Service category.

Mann ke Manjeeré 

A music album promoting women's rights. The title track and video for Mann ke Manjeeré is based on the true story of Shameem Pathan, who left an abusive marriage and became a truck driver to support herself and her child away from her violent husband. The album features five songs by Shubha Mudgal, composed by Shantanu Moitra, with lyrics by Prasoon Joshi. The record was released through Virgin records.

Awards and nominations 
 Making a Difference Award from Children’s Hope India (Mallika Dutt), New York, 2013
 YO DONA International Humanitarian Award (Mallika Dutt), Madrid, 2013
 Avon Global Award for Excellence in Communications, 2012
 Games for Change Transmedia Award Nomination, 2011
 Silver Lion, Cannes Film Festival (Bell Bajao), 2010
 Gold and Silver at Goafest, (Bell Bajao), 2009
 Karmaveer Puraskar: National Award for Social Justice & Citizen Action by the Indian Confederation of NGOs, (Mallika Dutt), 2009
 American Courage Award, Asian American Justice Center (AAJC), (Mallika Dutt), 2009
 Gold Spike, Spike Asia (Ring, Ring/Bell Bajao), 2009
 Young Achiever's Award from Advertising Club of Bombay (Bell Bajao), (O &M's Ryan Mendonca), 2009
 Best Integrated Campaign of the Year, Media Abby Award at Goafest for Public Service, Appeals and Charity (Bell Bajao), 2009
 Dogooder Nonprofit Award, Best Staff-Long Form Video (Death by Detention), 2009
 South Asian Media & Marketing Association (SAMMA) Trailblazer Award (Mallika Dutt), 2008
 The Woman of Color, Woman of Courage Award (IUP Women's Studies Program) (Mallika Dutt), 2008
 Bronze at the 41st Abby Awards in the Public Service, Appeals, and Charity Category (Is This Justice), 2008
 Radio & TV Advertising Practitioner’s Association of India (RAPA) Award for Best Film with a Social Message (Is This Justice?), 2007
 Clinton Global Initiative - Reducing Twin Pandemics: HIV/AIDS and Gender Based Violence, 2006
 Clinton Global Initiative - Value Families Campaign, 2006
 Award for Distinguished Service, New York University School of Law, BLAPA Alumni Association (Mallika Dutt), 2006
 Link TV Award for Best Music Video (Mann ke Manjeere and Babul), 2005
 Best Cinematography—U Judge It! Film Festival (Mann Ke Manjeere), 2003
 Best Exhibition Award to Artist—Haku Shah—India Habitat Centre (Haman Hain Ishq), 2003
 Spirit of Asian America Award—Asian American Federation of New York (Mallika Dutt), 2003
 Phoenix Award—New York Asian Women’s Center (Mallika Dutt), 2002
 Best Indipop Music Video—Screen Awards (Mann Ke Manjeere), 2001
 National Citizen’s Award (India) for Contribution to Women & Development (Mallika Dutt), 2001
 South Asian Women’s Creative Collection (SAWCC) Annual Achievement Award for Outstanding Contributions to the South Asian Community (Mallika Dutt), 2001

References

External links
Is this justice campaign
Is this justice video

International human rights organizations
Human rights organizations based in the United States
Women's organisations based in India
Women's organizations based in the United States